Platyusa is a monotypic genus of rove beetles in the family Staphylinidae. There is one described species in Platyusa, P. sonomae, found in the western United States.

References

Further reading

 
 
 
 
 
 
 
 

Aleocharinae